The 1983 Hardy Cup was the 1983 edition of the Canadian intermediate senior ice hockey championship.

Final
Best of 7
Winnipeg 7 Timmins 2
Winnipeg 4 Timmins 2
Winnipeg 4 Timmins 1
Winnipeg 7 Timmins 6
Winnipeg North End Flyers beat Timmins North Stars 4–0 on series.

External links
Hockey Canada

Hardy Cup
Hardy
Hardy Cup 1983